"My Silver Lining" is a song written by Roger Murrah and Tina Murrah, and recorded by American country music artist Mickey Gilley.  It was released in July 1979 as the lead single from his album Mickey Gilley.  The song reached number 8 on the U.S. Billboard Hot Country Singles chart and number 62 on the Canadian RPM Country Tracks chart.

Chart performance

References

1979 singles
1978 songs
Mickey Gilley songs
Songs written by Roger Murrah
Epic Records singles